Slapshot is the official mascot for the Washington Capitals NHL team based in Washington, D.C. He is a large bald eagle that wears the team's uniform with the number 00. Slapshot is seen at home games as well as at numerous community functions, and has become an important part of the Capitals brand throughout the D.C. region.

Biography

Slapshot was unveiled on November 18, 1995. He was first introduced to home fans by Stephanie Williams, a 5th Grader from Fairfax Station, Virginia who won a naming contest for the new mascot.

Slapshot can be seen at every home game and is often joined by secondary mascots, Air Slapshot and Hat Trick. He makes hundreds of appearances each year in the Maryland, Virginia and DC region, soaring into charity fundraisers, community festivals and parades. He has also performed across the country and in 2009 he was on The Price Is Right.

Slapshot often dons different costumes, such as Santa during the holidays and as the President to commemorate when the Washington Capitals won the Presidents' Trophy.
Slapshot also has a notable rivalry with the Carolina Hurricanes mascot Stormy.

Gallery

See also
List of NHL mascots

References

Washington Capitals
National Hockey League team mascots
Mascots introduced in 1995
Bird mascots